Pablo Damián Lavandeira Hernández (born 11 May 1990) is an Uruguayan footballer who currently plays for Alianza Lima as a attacking midfielder.

References

External links
 Pablo Lavandeira at Football-Lineups
 
 

1990 births
Living people
Uruguayan footballers
Uruguayan expatriate footballers
Peñarol players
Tacuarembó F.C. players
Cerro Largo F.C. players
C.A. Progreso players
C.D. Antofagasta footballers
Audax Italiano footballers
Montevideo Wanderers F.C. players
Uruguayan Primera División players
Uruguayan Segunda División players
Peruvian Primera División players
Chilean Primera División players
Ascenso MX players
Association football midfielders
Uruguayan expatriate sportspeople in Chile
Uruguayan expatriate sportspeople in Mexico
Uruguayan expatriate sportspeople in Peru
Expatriate footballers in Chile
Expatriate footballers in Mexico
Expatriate footballers in Peru